Cadarena is a monotypic moth genus of the family Crambidae erected by Frederic Moore in 1886. Its only species, Cadarena pudoraria, was first described by Jacob Hübner in 1825. It occurs throughout tropical and subtropical Africa and in India.

A known larval food plants are of the genera Gossypium and Adenia and the species Sida rhombifolia.

References

Spilomelinae
Crambidae
Crambidae genera
Monotypic moth genera
Moths of Africa
Moths of Asia
Moths of the Comoros
Moths of Madagascar
Moths of Réunion
Moths of Seychelles
Taxa named by Frederic Moore